Harpalinae is a subfamily of ground beetles that contains more than 3,000 species in 4 tribes worldwide, according to the Carabcat Database. A rarely used common name for the subfamily is the harp beetles. The Harpalinae contain the most apomorphic ground beetles, displaying a wide range of forms and behaviors. Some are, rare among ground beetles, omnivores or even herbivores.

Systematics 

Many closely related taxa have been treated as subordinates of the Harpalinae by various authors. 24 tribes and more than 6,000 species were formerly included in Harpalinae. As a result of recent phylogenetic research, most of those tribes were transferred to other subfamilies or promoted to subfamilies of their own. Harpalinae currently consists of 4 tribes and around 3,100 species.

Tribes

These four tribes belong to Harpalinae. The genera of Harpalinae are included in the tribe pages.
 Anisodactylini Lacordaire, 1854
 Harpalini Bonelli, 1810
 Pelmatellini Bates, 1882
 Stenolophini Kirby, 1837

References

 
Carabidae subfamilies
Taxa named by Franco Andrea Bonelli